Tim Pekin (born 22 January 1965) is a former Australian rules footballer in the VFL/AFL.

Recruited from Colac-Coragulac, Pekin debuted with the Fitzroy Football Club in 1984 and was a solid contributor in many positions on the ground. His consistency meant he played 107 games for the club (for 15 goals). 

Pekin was delisted from the cash-strapped Lions at the end of 1989 due to his refusal of a lower salary, so went to the St Kilda Football Club where he was also a noted performer. He also went on to make a name for himself at the Saints, passing the 100-game barrier at a second club to end up with 112 games at the Saints (37 goals).

References

External links
 
 

1965 births
Living people
Fitzroy Football Club players
St Kilda Football Club players
Colac Football Club players
Australian rules footballers from Victoria (Australia)